Eaton is a village and civil parish in the unitary authority of Cheshire East and the ceremonial county of Cheshire, England. According to the 2001 census, the population of the civil parish was 289. Congleton is the nearest large town.Buses serve the Village Monday to Saturday

See also

Listed buildings in Eaton, Cheshire East
Christ Church, Eaton

References

External links

Villages in Cheshire
Civil parishes in Cheshire